This is a list of National Register of Historic Places properties and districts in downtown Baltimore, Maryland, United States.  Many other properties are located in other parts of the city; for these, see National Register of Historic Places listings in Baltimore, Maryland.

The locations of the National Register properties and districts listed below (at least for all showing latitude and longitude coordinates below) may be seen in a map by clicking on "Map of all coordinates".

Much of the central portion of the city and significant portions of the waterfront and city park system are included in the federally designated Baltimore National Heritage Area.

Current listings

|}

Former listings

|}

See also
National Register of Historic Places listings in Maryland

References

History of Baltimore
Central